Fort Conrad was a U.S. Army fort established in Socorro County, New Mexico Territory in 1851.  

Fort Conrad was located near modern Tiffany, New Mexico. It was on the west side of the Rio Grande. Because of its location, it was later abandoned for Fort Craig in 1854.

References 

Geography of Socorro County, New Mexico
Conrad
History of Socorro County, New Mexico
1851 establishments in New Mexico Territory
1854 disestablishments in New Mexico Territory
Military installations established in 1851
Military installations closed in 1854